Scaphochlamys reticosa is a monocotyledonous plant species first described by Henry Nicholas Ridley, and given its current name by Rosemary Margaret Smith. Scaphochlamys reticosa is part of the genus Scaphochlamys and the family Zingiberaceae. No subspecies are listed in the Catalog of Life.

References

reticosa
Taxa named by Rosemary Margaret Smith